Deers may refer to:

Deers, Illinois, an unincorporated community in Champaign County
DEERS (Defense Enrollment Eligibility Reporting System)
Deer, improperly pluralized as "deers", ruminant mammals

See also
Deers Den, an archaeological site at Kintore, Aberdeenshire, Scotland
The Deer's Bell, a Chinese animated film produced by Shanghai Animation Film Studio
Deer's Mill, Indiana, an unincorporated town in Ripley Township, Montgomery County
Deer (disambiguation)